Wasserstein is a surname and can refer to:

 Bernard Wasserstein, British historian
 Bruce Wasserstein, a former investment banker and former CEO of Lazard
 Wendy Wasserstein, American Playwright
 Wasserstein Perella & Co., an investment bank built by Bruce Wasserstein and Joseph R. Perella
 Dresdner Kleinwort Wasserstein, an investment bank, part of Dresdner Bank
 Ned Wasserstein, a real estate developer and owner of Waterstone Property Management
 Leonid Nasonovich Vasershtein, a Russian-American mathematician

It is also used to name:

 Wasserstein metric, a mathematical distance measure